Mägenwil is a railway station in the municipality of Mägenwil in the Swiss canton of Aargau. The station is located on the Heitersberg line.

The station is served by service S11 of the Zurich S-Bahn.

References 

Railway stations in the canton of Aargau
Swiss Federal Railways stations